Evelina Papantoniou (born 7 June 1979) is a Greek actress, model and beauty pageant titleholder.

Miss Universe 2001
Papantoniou won Miss Star Hellas in 2001 gaining the right to represent Greece at the Miss Universe 2001 pageant in Bayamón, Puerto Rico, where she finished as 1st Runner-Up to Denise Quiñones of Puerto Rico. During the pageant she was one of the favorites to win among fans and pageant sites.

Personal
She started modeling at the age of 15, and worked as a bartender and waitress. She was part of an elite volunteer team that supported and counseled victims after the earthquake which hit Athens in 1999. She has a diploma in Arts and Interior Design and enjoys sculpting, painting and photography. Aside from modeling, she has also had some parts in various films. At the moment, she is pursuing a modeling career, represented by Ace Models Agency and appearing on the covers of numerous fashion magazines, such as Close Up, Vogue, and Madam.

Papantoniou was engaged to marry the Indian arms dealer Abhishek Verma in 2002.

References

External links

Evelina's profile at Ace Models
Evelina Papantoniou @ Miss Universe Gateway Tribute

1979 births
Greek beauty pageant winners
Greek female models
Living people
Miss Universe 2001 contestants
Actresses from Athens
Models from Athens